Siemens Financial Services (SFS) is a Division of Siemens. The company’s global headquarters is in Munich, Germany. SFS offers international financing solutions in the business-to-business area. Financial Services serves Siemens as well as other companies – primarily in the energy, industry, healthcare and infrastructure & cities markets. The division finances infrastructure, equipment as well as working capital investments, and acts as a manager of financial risks within Siemens AG. The network of financing companies coordinated by Siemens Financial Services GmbH in Munich comprises about 3,150 employees worldwide.

History 
The Siemens Group first bundled its financial activities into an organizational unit in October 1997. In addition to developing the financial business, the main focus at the time was to increase transparency for investors – by creating a separate financing balance sheet. Since 1999, Siemens Financial Services has been the center of expertise for financial services and the provider of financial risk management for Siemens in the market for business-to-business financial solutions.

From the very start, SFS’ responsibility included Siemens’ leasing and alternative forms of asset and equipment financing as well as project financing and equity participations. SFS was also put in charge of Siemens’ treasury and payment-transaction solutions as well as of the financial management of pension assets. In 2000, these responsibilities were expanded to include Siemens’ insurance operations – and later its venture capital activities.

In addition to the expansion of business operations, SFS’ international presence has grown (including the acquisition of Schroder Leasing in Great Britain in 2000).

In recent years, expansion has taken place not only in the established European and North American markets, but also increasingly in emerging markets. In March 2005, Siemens Financial Services established its own leasing company in China, Siemens Finance and Leasing Ltd. (SFLL) with headquarters in Beijing. At the start of 2011, Russia’s Federal Antimonopoly Services approved the acquisition of ZAO DeltaLeasing, a provider of equipment financing in Russia. On October 1, 2011, DeltaLeasing was renamed OOO Siemens Finance.

In June 2011, Siemens Financial Services Private Limited was established in India and was granted its non-banking finance license (NBFC license) from the Reserve Bank of India (RBI). Since then, the subsidiary has been providing financing solutions for Siemens’ customers in India.

At the end of 2010, Siemens Financial Services received its banking license in Germany from the German Federal Financial Supervisory Authority. Siemens Bank GmbH adds loans and guarantees to the SFS product portfolio particularly in the sales-financing area.

In 2019, some of the functions of SFS has been moved to Siemens AG, as corporate unit, CF Financing.

Executive management 
 Veronika Bienert, CEO of Siemens Financial Services GmbH since October 2021. 
 Dr. Andreas Rudolf, CFO of Siemens Financial Services GmbH since October 2021.

Business units 
Siemens Financial Services (SFS) has four Business Units:  
 Commercial Finance (COF) 
 Equity Finance (EQ)
 Project & Structured Finance Debt - Americas (PS-AM)
 Project & Structured Finance Debt - EMEA / AA (PS-EA)

Global reach 
As a worldwide financial services provider in the business-to-business area, SFS has an international network of financing companies at its disposal (as of September 30, 2016). 
 North and South America 
 Total assets €12.3 billion  
 Europe, Africa & CIS
 Total assets €11.1 billion 
 Asia, Australia, and the Middle East 
 Total assets €3.1 billion

Research

The company provides research covering aspects of finance. Research reports written over the past four years include:

Further reading
Feldenkirchen, Wilfried (2000). Siemens, From Workshop to Global Player, Munich.
Feldenkirchen, Wilfried / Eberhard Posner (2005): The Siemens Entrepreneurs, Continuity and Change, 1847–2005, Ten Portraits, Munich.

References

Siemens
Financial services companies established in 1997
Financial services companies based in Munich